Scolytus multistriatus, the European elm bark beetle or smaller European elm bark beetle, is a bark beetle species in the genus Scolytus. In Europe, while S. multistriatus acts as vector of the Dutch elm disease, caused by the Ascomycota Ophiostoma ulmi, it is much less effective than the large elm bark beetle, S. scolytus.

S. multistriatus uses vanillin and syringaldehyde as signals to find a host tree during oviposition.

References

External links 

Scolytinae
Insect pests of temperate forests
Beetles described in 1802